Gillingham is an English surname. Notable people with the surname include:

 Anna Gillingham (1878–1963), educator and psychologist
 Brad Gillingham (born 1970), American world champion powerlifter 
 Charlie Gillingham (born 1960), keyboardist and multi-instrumentalist 
 David Gillingham (born 1947), contemporary American composer
 Francis Gillingham (1916–2010)
 Francis John Gillingham, pioneering neurosurgeon
 Frank Gillingham (1875–1953), English cricketer. He played for Essex between 1903 and 1928
 Gale Gillingham (1944–2011), American football player
 George Gillingham (died 1668), Canon of Windsor from 1639 to 1668
 Joanie Gillingham (born 1961), Canadian rower
 John Gillingham, Medieval historian and emeritus professor of the London School of Economics 
 Karl Gillingham (born 1965), American professional strongman and powerlifter
 Martin Gillingham (born 1963), English sports commentator and journalist
 Nick Gillingham, British Olympian
 Susan E. Gillingham (born 1951), British theologian
 William Gillingham (disambiguation), multiple people

English toponymic surnames